James Joseph O'Keeffe (1912 – 20 May 1986) was an Irish Fine Gael politician. A merchant and company director, he was a member of the Seanad from 1956 to 1961. During this period he also stood unsuccessfully for Dáil Éireann in the Dublin South-West constituency at the 1951 and 1957 general elections. He succeeded at the third attempt in being elected for Dublin South-West in 1961. However he lost his seat at the 1965 general election despite increasing his vote. He stood again in 1969 and 1977 in the newly created Dublin Rathmines West but did not regain his seat.

He was also Lord Mayor of Dublin from 1962 to 1963, and from 1974 to 1975.

References

 

1912 births
1986 deaths
Fine Gael TDs
Lord Mayors of Dublin
Members of the 8th Seanad
Members of the 9th Seanad
Members of the 17th Dáil
Fine Gael senators